

Squads

Australia  

Head Coach:  Tim Sheens

On 12 October, Tim Sheens named the following players as part of his squad in preparation for the tournament. Of the twenty four players, twenty three were Australian born while one was New Zealand born.

* Replaced Jarryd Hayne on October 15 after his withdrawal.

England 

Head Coach:  Steve McNamara

On 5 October, Steve McNamara named the following 24 players as part of his squad in preparation for the tournament. Of the twenty four players, twenty three were English born while one was Australian born.

New Zealand  

Head Coach:  Stephen Kearney

On 6 October, Stephen Kearney named 24 players as part of his squad in preparation for the tournament. Of the twenty four players, twenty were New Zealand born while four were Australian born.

1 Replaced Dallin Watene-Zelezniak who withdrew due to injury on October 22.

2 Replaced Sam Moa who withdrew due to family reasons on October 17.

Samoa 

Head Coach:  Matt Parish

On 7 October, Matt Parish named 23 players as part of his squad in preparation for the tournament. Of the twenty four players, twelve were New Zealand born while ten were Australian born and just two Samoan borns.

1 Added to the squad on October 15 taking their squad number to 24.

2 Replaced Suaia Matagi on October 11 as he had also been named in the New Zealand squad and opted to play for them.

References

Rugby League Four Nations
2014 in rugby league